William Daniel (died 1633) was an English merchant and briefly a Member of Parliament.

He was the father of two sons, including a later MP for Truro, Richard Daniel. In 1601, he was one of the Members of Parliament for Truro.

References

1633 deaths
Members of the Parliament of England for Truro
16th-century English people
People from Truro
Year of birth missing
Place of birth missing
English MPs 1601